James Ben Ali Haggin (December 9, 1822 – September 12, 1914) was an American
attorney, rancher, investor, art collector, and a major owner and breeder in the sport of Thoroughbred horse racing. Haggin made a fortune in the aftermath of the California Gold Rush and was a multi-millionaire by 1880.

Those who recounted James Ben Ali Haggin's appearance often noted his short stature and "slightly Oriental appearance handed down from his Turkish ancestors".

Life

Haggin was born in Harrodsburg, Mercer County, Kentucky, a descendant of one of the state's pioneer families who had settled there in 1775 and a descendant of Ibrahim Ben Ali, who was an early American settler of Turkish origin. He graduated from Centre College at Danville, Kentucky, then entered the practice of law.

On December 28, 1846, James Ben Ali Haggin married Eliza Jane Sanders of Natchez, Mississippi with whom he had five children. She died in 1893 and on December 30, 1897 the seventy-five-year-old Haggin married twenty-eight-year-old Margaret Pearl Voorhies at her stepfather's residence in Versailles, Kentucky. Miss Voorhies was a niece of his first wife.

In October 1850 he joined a Kentucky acquaintance, Lloyd Tevis, in opening a law office in Sacramento. They moved to San Francisco in 1853. He built a large and impressive Nob Hill mansion on the east side of Taylor Street between Clay and Washington streets, which stood until the earthquake and fire of 1906. It was to decorate the walls of the 61 rooms of this mansion that Haggin began the core of the family art collection that would eventually be housed in the Haggin Museum (named for his son Louis Terah Haggin) in Stockton, California.

Haggin and Tevis married sisters, daughters of Colonel Lewis Sanders, a Kentuckian who had emigrated to California. Haggin and Tevis acquired the Rancho Del Paso land grant near Sacramento.  The two invested in the mining business with George Hearst as one of their partners. Hearst, Haggin, Tevis and Co. became one of the largest mining companies in the United States; its operations included the Ontario silver mine in Park City, Utah, the Homestake Mine in South Dakota, and with Marcus Daly, the Anaconda Copper Company in Montana.

The James Ben Ali Haggin Papers, 1887-1914, are kept at the Bancroft Library at the University of California at Berkeley.

Thoroughbred racing
Haggin purchased the Rancho Del Paso horse farm near Sacramento, California in 1859. He made it one of the country's most important horse breeding and Thoroughbred racing operations whose horses competed from coast-to-coast. In 1905, Haggin stopped using Rancho De Paso as a horse breeding farm  and concentrated his breeding efforts at his Elmendorf Farm in Lexington, Kentucky. Haggin had acquired Elmendorf in 1897 and until his death in 1914 worked to develop it into the largest horse breeding operation in the United States of its era.

Major racing successes
Haggin owned the colt  Tyrant which in 1885 he sent to compete as a three-year-old on the U.S. East Coast where he won the prestigious Withers and Belmont Stakes, the latter becoming the third leg of the U.S. Triple Crown series. The following year his colt Ben Ali won the 1886 Kentucky Derby.

At Rancho Del Paso Haggin bred Comanche and  Africander, colts which won the 1893 and 1903 Belmont Stakes respectively.

Honors
He is the namesake of the Ben Ali Stakes at Keeneland Race Course in Lexington.

Mount Haggin (10,607 ft / 3,233 m), in the Anaconda Range ten miles from the town of Anaconda in southwestern Montana, also is named for James Ben Ali Haggin.

Personal life
Haggin was the eldest of eight children of Terah Temple and Adeline (Ben Ali) Haggin, the daughter of Ibrahim Ben Ali, a Turkish army officer.

In 1846 Haggin married Eliza Jane Sanders; they had two sons and three daughters, including  Louis Terah, James Ben Ali, Jr., Margaret Sanders, Adeline Ben Ali, and Edith Hunter

In 1897 Haggin married Margaret ("Pearl") Voorhies of Versailles, Kentucky.

Haggin died September 12, 1914, at his Newport, Rhode Island, residence and was buried in Woodlawn Cemetery in New York.

His grandson, James Ben Ali Haggin III, was a portrait painter and stage designer.

His grandson, Richard Lounsbery, was a businessman and amateur painter who established the Richard Lounsbery Foundation.

His descendants in Thoroughbred racing include Louis Lee Haggin II and William Haggin Perry.

See also
Haggin Museum

References

Further reading

External links

 James Ben Ali Haggin biography sourced from the History of Kentucky (1928), J. S. Clarke Publishing Company, Louisville Kentucky
 Information on James Ben Ali Haggin at the Richard Lounsbery Foundation
 History of Rancho Del Paso at the Del Paso Country Club

1822 births
1914 deaths
Centre College alumni
California lawyers
American mining businesspeople
American racehorse owners and breeders
Owners of Kentucky Derby winners
People from Harrodsburg, Kentucky
American people of Turkish descent
Burials at Woodlawn Cemetery (Bronx, New York)
Agriculture in Kentucky
Businesspeople from Kentucky
19th-century American businesspeople
19th-century American lawyers